Rex Booth (9 July 1893 – 25 April 1967) was a New Zealand cricketer. He played in four first-class matches for Canterbury in 1917/18.

See also
 List of Canterbury representative cricketers

References

External links
 

1893 births
1967 deaths
New Zealand cricketers
Canterbury cricketers
Cricketers from Christchurch